Paul Seabrook Graham (July 7, 1892 - September 1985) was an American college football player and coach. He served as the head football coach at Rensselaer Polytechnic Institute in Troy, New York from 1920 to 1926 and again from 1942 to 1945.

Graham was a native of Dayton, Ohio and attended the Springfield YMCA Training School (now Springfield College) in Springfield, Massachusetts.

References

1892 births
1985 deaths
RPI Engineers football coaches
Springfield Pride football players
Players of American football from Dayton, Ohio